The Henry County Courthouse is a historic courthouse building in Napoleon, Ohio, United States.  Designed in the Second Empire style by architect David W. Gibbs, it was built in 1880 and added to the National Register of Historic Places on February 28, 1973. The cost of the building was $95,000. The courthouse is topped with a 1880 statue of Lady Justice.

See also
National Register of Historic Places listings in Ohio
Henry County Courthouse (disambiguation)

References

External links 
 National Register listings for Henry County

Courthouses on the National Register of Historic Places in Ohio
Buildings and structures in Henry County, Ohio
National Register of Historic Places in Henry County, Ohio
County courthouses in Ohio
Government buildings completed in 1880
Clock towers in Ohio
Napoleon, Ohio